Fischer Ridge is an ice-covered ridge trending northwest–southeast between Kirk Glacier and Ironside Glacier in the Admiralty Mountains of Victoria Land, Antarctica. It was mapped by the United States Geological Survey from surveys and U.S. Navy air photos, 1960–63, and was named by the Advisory Committee on Antarctic Names for William H. Fischer, an Atmospheric Chemist at McMurdo Station, 1966–67.

References 

Ridges of Victoria Land
Borchgrevink Coast